Darayim is a district in Badakhshan province, Afghanistan.  It was created in 2005 from part of Fayzabad District and is home to an estimated 68,419 residents.

See also 
 Fayzabad District

References

External links
Map at the Afghanistan Information Management Services

Districts of Badakhshan Province